Peter David Lyman Stansky (born January 18, 1932) is an American historian specializing in modern British history.

Works

Ambitions and Strategies: The Struggle for the Leadership of the Liberal Party in the 1890s (1964)
England Since 1867: Continuity and Change (1973)
Gladstone: A Progress in Politics (1979)
William Morris (1983)
Redesigning the World: William Morris, the 1880s, and the Arts and Crafts (1985)
On or About December 1910: Early Bloomsbury and its Intimate World (1996)
Another Book that Never Was (1998)
From William Morris to Sergeant Pepper (1999) includes bibliography of writings 1954-1998
Sassoon: The Worlds of Philip and Sybil (2003)
Journey to the Frontier: Julian Bell and John Cornford: Their lives and the 1930s, with William Abrahams (1966)
The Unknown Orwell, with William Abrahams (1972)
Orwell: The Transformation, with William Abrahams (1979)
London's Burning, with William Abrahams (1994)
The Left and War: The British Labour Party and the First World War, Editor (1969)
John Morley Nineteenth Century Essays, Editor (1970)
Winston Churchill: A Profile, Editor (1973)
The Victorian Revolution, Editor (1973)
On Nineteen Eighty-Four, Editor (1983)
The Aesthetic Movement and the Art and Crafts Movement, Editor, with Rodney Shewan. A reprint series of 73 volumes (1976, 1979)
Conference on British Studies Biographical series, Editor, 6 vols.(1968-1974)
Modern British History Series, Editor, 18 vol. with Leslie Hume (1982)
Modern European History Series, Editor, 47 vols. (1987-1992)
The First Day of the Blitz (2007)
Julian Bell: From Bloomsbury to the Spanish Civil War (2012)
Edward Upward: Art and Life (2016)

Notes

External links
Guide to the Peter Stansky Papers
"Peter Stansky: An Oral History," Stanford Historical Society Oral History Program, 2013.
"Peter Stansky: An Oral History," Faculty Senate Oral History Project, Stanford Historical Society Oral History Program, 2017.

1932 births
Living people
21st-century American historians
21st-century American male writers
Writers from New York City
Stanford University faculty
Historians of the United Kingdom
Historians from New York (state)
Harvard University alumni
Alumni of King's College, Cambridge
Yale University alumni
American male non-fiction writers